Cumberland, Maryland has several media outlets, most carrying some form of satellite programming. WCBC-AM and the Cumberland Times-News actively collect their local news content, while WFRB-FM has some local news content, but do not actively collect it.

Aside from some local news programming, virtually no mass media content originates from Cumberland. The local media tends to rebroadcast Hagerstown, Baltimore and Washington, DC television stations for news coverage.

Commercial Media is available from such companies as Allegany Media, and Commercial Video.  Both companies as based out of Cumberland, Maryland.

Print
 Allegany Magazine (Cumberland)
 Bedford Gazette (Bedford, PA)
 Cumberland Times-News (Cumberland)
 Daily American (Somerset, PA)
 Keyser Mineral Daily News-Tribune (Keyser, WV)
 Morgan Messenger (Berkeley Springs, WV)

Historic

 1808-1809: Cumberland Impartialist
 1809-1809: American Eagle
 1813-1818: Allegany Freeman
 1814-181?: Alleghany Federalist
 1814-1814: Cumberland Gazette
 1820-1867: Alleganian
 1823-1832: Advocate, and Farmers' & Mechanics' Register
 1823-1835: Maryland Advocate
 1828-1882: Civilian
 1829-1851: Cumberland Civilian
 1832-1838: Advocate
 1833-1840: Phoenix Civilian
 1843-1902: Cumberland Alleganian
 1851-185?: Unionist
 1851-1856: Cumberland Miners' Journal Cumberland
 1852-1859: Cumberland Telegraph
 1859-1875: Civilian & Telegraph
 1861-1861: Democratic Alleganian
 1862-1867: Allegany County Gazette
 1862-1868: Cumberland Union
 1869-186?: Mountain City Times
 1872-1891: Cumberland Daily Times
 1876-1877: Cumberland Alleganian and Daily Times
 1877-1878: Daily Alleganian and Times
 1877-1879: Alleganian and Times
 1878-1881: Cumberland Times
 1879-187?:  Independent
 1881-1884:  Daily Times
 1882-1890:  Sunday Civilian
 1890-189?:  Daily News
 1890-189?:  Weekly Civilian
 1891-189?: Cumberland Freie Presse
 1894-1895: Sunday Scimitar
 1912-191?: Cumberland Press
 1892-1916:  Evening Times
 1935-193?: Cumberland Guide
 1871-1938: Cumberland Daily News
 1937-1938: Voice
 1938-1942:  Voice of Labor
 1942-194?: CIO News: Western Maryland edition
 1961-1961: Allegany Garrett Citizen
 1961-1983:  Citizen
 1938-1988: Cumberland News
 1916-1988: Cumberland Evening Times
 1988-present: Cumberland Times-News

References
 Albert L. Feldstein, Feldstein's Historic Banner Front Pages of the Cumberland Daily News, Cumberland News and Cumberland Evening News vol I: 20th Century (Cumberland: Albert L. Feldstein, 1986).
 Albert L. Feldstein, Feldstein's Historic Newspapers of Allegany County vol. II: 19th and 20th Centuries (Cumberland: Albert L. Feldstein, 1987)

Radio
Cumberland is served by 18 radio stations, 14 FM and 4 AM.  Most are owned by local companies, such as WTBO-WKGO Corporation, LLC, which owns WFRB 560/WFRB-FM 105.3, WRQE 106.1 and WTBO-AM 1450; Cumberland Broadcasting Company owns two stations, WCBC-AM 1270/FM 107.1. Others are owned by West Virginia Radio Corporation out of nearby Morgantown, WV.

FM band 

all stations listed cover Cumberland with a city grade signal

AM band 

all stations listed cover Cumberland with a city grade signal

Television
Cumberland and the surrounding area are part of the Washington, D. C. television market.

Cumberland is home to TBN translator, W43BP, broadcast from nearby Cresaptown, Maryland.  Channel 43 covers Cumberland and Frostburg with a city-grade signal simulcasting TBN's main signal.  W43BP has requested a "construction permit" to broadcast as a digital (or HD) low-power translator.  This will be done "flash-cut" when it does happen.  W43BP is carried on Atlantic Broadband cable channel 49 for Cumberland, Frostburg, and Keyser.  W43BP is owned by Trinity Broadcasting Network.

Local TV news is provided by Hagerstown station, WDVM-TV 25.  Rarely though is Cumberland or any part of Western Maryland featured unless it is a large story.

Cable television
Atlantic Broadband provides cable service to Cumberland.  Nearby communities Frostburg, Maryland, Keyser, West Virginia and Grantsville, Maryland are served Comcast (formerly Adelphia).

See also
 Maryland media
 List of newspapers in Maryland
 List of radio stations in Maryland
 List of television stations in Maryland
 Media of locales in Maryland: Baltimore, College Park,  Frederick, Gaithersburg

Mass media in Cumberland, MD-WV-PA
Cumberland